Hyun Hong-choo (19 August 1940 – 26 May 2017) was a South Korean lawyer, politician and diplomat.

He began his legal studies at Seoul National University. Upon graduation in 1963, he took the bar exam and became a prosecutor in 1968. Hyun earned an LLM at Columbia University in the United States in 1969. He worked as a prosecutor until 1978, and was elected to the National Assembly as a member of the Democratic Justice Party in 1985.

Hyun stepped down from the legislature in 1988 and was appointed the government legislation chief under president Roh Tae-woo. Hyun was credited with implementing Roh's policy of nordpolitik, and as a diplomat, helped South Korea expand bilateral relations with a number of countries, including Hungary, Poland, Yugoslavia, Czechoslovakia, Bulgaria, and Romania. He was named ambassador to the United Nations in 1990 and became ambassador to the United States the following year, serving until 1993. Hyun then returned to private practice, specializing in international trade and investment. Between 2007 and 2013, Hyun served on the National Unification Advisory Council and was also a national security adviser. From 2013, Hyun taught at the Korea National Diplomatic Academy, a school run by the Ministry of Foreign Affairs.

References

External links

Hyun speaking on "The Future of U.S.–South Korea Relations" CC-BY

1940 births
2017 deaths
Columbia Law School alumni
Seoul National University School of Law alumni
South Korean diplomats
20th-century South Korean lawyers
Democratic Justice Party politicians
Members of the National Assembly (South Korea)
Ambassadors of South Korea to the United States
Permanent Representatives of South Korea to the United Nations
People of the Korean Central Intelligence Agency
People of the Agency for National Security Planning
South Korean prosecutors